B&B Hotels–KTM was a French UCI ProSeries road cycling team that formed for the 2018 season as Vital Concept Cycling Team. It was first presented at a press conference on 17 August 2017, with an initial budget of €6 million, by its manager Jérôme Pineau. At this press conference fifteen riders were presented, with Bryan Coquard as leader, with another five riders were announced at a later date. The team sponsors the Vélo Club Pays de Loudéac and their headquarters are based in Theix. On 6 January 2018 the team missed out on a wildcard to that year's Tour de France, but were awarded a place in the Critérium du Dauphiné.

The team secured further sponsorship from the Brittany-based hotel chain, B&B Hotels, with the team to be known as Vital Concept–B&B Hotels for the 2019 season. For 2020, the team became B&B Hotels–Vital Concept, as B&B Hotels became the principal sponsor of the team.

The team folded in December 2022.

Team roster

Major results

Continental Championships
2019
 European Track (Individual pursuit), Corentin Ermenault
 European Track (Points race), Bryan Coquard

References

External links

UCI Professional Continental teams
Cycling teams based in France
Cycling teams established in 2018
2018 establishments in France